Eichhagen station is a railway station in the municipality of Eichhagen, located in the Olpe district in North Rhine-Westphalia, Germany.

Notable places nearby
Biggesee

References

Railway stations in North Rhine-Westphalia